Prism Health is a health clinic located on Southeast Belmont Street, in Portland, Oregon's Buckman neighborhood, in the United States. Prism became Oregon's first LGBT primary health clinic in 2017, and opened as an extension of the Cascade AIDS Project.

The 7,750-square-foot space has 10 exam rooms, plus additional rooms for meetings and counseling, gender-neutral restrooms, and a pharmacy. Prism provides HIV and STI testing, mental and transgender health services, and free condoms and dental dams.

The clinic received $200,000 in operational support from Multnomah County.

See also
 Healthcare and the LGBT community

References

External links
 
 

2017 establishments in Oregon
Buckman, Portland, Oregon
LGBT and health care
LGBT in Oregon